The Instituto Tecnológico de las Américas (ITLA) is a university in Santo Domingo.

External links
 Universia

Education in Santo Domingo
Universities in the Dominican Republic